Kyasamballi Chengaluraya Reddy (4 May 1902 – 27 February 1976) was the first Chief Minister of Mysore State (Now Karnataka). Reddy later served as the Governor of Madhya Pradesh.

Early life
K.C. Reddy was born on 4 May 1902 into a Vokkaliga family in Kyasamballi village, Kolar district. He was a revolutionary from childhood and participated in many protests against British rule in India.

Career
After graduating in law, Reddy along with other political activists, founded the Praja Paksha (Peoples' Party) in 1930. The aim of this party was to achieve responsible government in the Princely state of Mysore. The party gained support in rural areas as it largely highlighted the issues of farmers. The Praja Paksha and Praja Mitra Mandali joined to form the Praja Samyukta Paksha (Mysore People's Federation) in 1934. Reddy served as its president from 1935 to 1937. Later, the federation merged with the Indian National Congress and participated in the Indian independence movement. Reddy served as the president of Mysore Congress twice, in 1937–38 and 1946–47. He was also a member of the Constituent Assembly of India.

After independence of India in 1947, he was at the forefront of the Mysore Chalo movement seeking responsible state government in Mysore State and went on to become the first Chief Minister of the state. He served in this position from 1947 to 1952.

Reddy was elected as a member of the Mysore Legislative Assembly in 1952. Subsequently, he served as a member of the Rajya Sabha from 1952 to 1957 and as a member of the Lok Sabha, representing Kolar from 1957 to 1962. During this period, he also served as Union Minister for Housing and Supplies (1957–61) and as Union Minister for Commerce and Industries (1961–62). Later, he also served as Governor of Madhya Pradesh from 1965 to 1971.

Reddy's birth centenary was commemorated in 2002 when his contribution towards the development of Karnataka was hailed.

See also
 List of Chief Ministers of Mysore State
 List of Governors of Madhya Pradesh

References

1902 births
1976 deaths
Chief Ministers of Karnataka
People from Kolar district
Governors of Madhya Pradesh
Members of the Constituent Assembly of India
India MPs 1957–1962
Rajya Sabha members from Karnataka
Lok Sabha members from Karnataka
Chief ministers from Indian National Congress
Indian National Congress politicians from Karnataka
Commerce and Industry Ministers of India
Mysore MLAs 1952–1957
Members of the Mysore Legislature
India MPs 1962–1967